was an influential Japanese Rinzai zen master and founder of Nippon wo Mamoru kai. He was also a prolific writer and a calligrapher.

Born in Shizuoka Prefecture, Asahina graduated from Nihon University. He studied at Myōshin-ji in Kyoto and at Engaku-ji in Kamakura. He rose to become the head of the Engaku-ji branch of Rinzai Zen. Also, he was a professor at Komazawa University.

Asahina's works include Zen (bilingual, English and Japanese; 1954), Nippon no Zen (1959) and commentaries on the Hekiganroku and Rinzairoku.

Asahina was also an accomplished calligrapher. Television shows, including Mito Kōmon and Ōoka Echizen, featured his writing in their title screens. His writing can also be seen in the memorial to Gichin Funakoshi at Engaku-ji.

Sources
This article incorporates material from 朝比奈宗源 (Asahina Sōgen) in the Japanese Wikipedia, retrieved on March 16, 2008.

External links
日本全国書誌 JAPANESE NATIONAL BIBLIOGRAPHY National Diet Library

1891 births
1979 deaths
People from Shizuoka Prefecture
Rinzai Buddhists
Zen Buddhist clergy
Japanese Zen Buddhists
Nihon University alumni